The 1960 Kansas gubernatorial election was held on November 8, 1960. Republican nominee John Anderson Jr. defeated Democratic incumbent George Docking with 55.5% of the vote.

Primary elections
Primary elections were held on August 2, 1960.

Republican primary

Candidates
John Anderson Jr., Kansas Attorney General
McDill "Huck" Boyd, Newspaper publisher
W.H. "Bill" Addington, State Representative

Results

General election

Candidates
Major party candidates
John Anderson Jr., Republican 
George Docking, Democratic

Other candidates
J. J. Steele, Prohibition

Results

References

1960
Kansas
Gubernatorial
November 1960 events in the United States